Mtego wa Noti is an administrative ward in Uvinza District of Kigoma Region in Tanzania. 
In 2016 the Tanzania National Bureau of Statistics report there were 16,850 people in the ward, from 15,308 in 2012.

References

Wards of Kigoma Region